"Loco Contigo" (English: "Crazy for You") is a song by French DJ and record producer DJ Snake, Colombian singer J Balvin, and American rapper Tyga. Written alongside Justin Quiles, it was released on 14 June 2019 by DJ Snake Music Productions and Geffen Records as the sixth single from Snake's second studio album Carte Blanche. The official remix omits Tyga and features new guests Ozuna, Nicky Jam, Natti Natasha, Sech, and Darell.

Charts

Weekly charts

Year-end charts

Certifications

Release history

See also
List of Billboard number-one Latin songs of 2019

References

2019 singles
2019 songs
Macaronic songs
DJ Snake songs
J Balvin songs
Tyga songs
Songs written by DJ Snake
Songs written by J Balvin
Songs written by Tyga
Songs written by Justin Quiles
Geffen Records singles